Tom Gray is a British songwriter, composer, and activist. He is a founding member of the rock band Gomez, and the founder of the Broken Record campaign. He is the recipient of the 2022 Unsung Hero Award presented by the Music Producer’s Guild UK.

Work
Gray is a founding member and one of three vocalists in the UK indie rock band Gomez. With Gomez, he won the Mercury Prize in 1998.
 
He founded the Broken Record campaign in March 2020 to seek fairer remuneration for music creators, especially from streaming. The campaign helped to initiate a UK parliamentary inquiry into the ‘Economics of streaming’. In April 2021, Gray wrote a letter to the British Prime Minister Boris Johnson, requesting better rights for creators and for the industry to be referred to the UK Competition and Markets Authority. The letter was co-signed by other 200 notable individuals in UK music industry including The Rolling Stones, Paul McCartney, Kate Bush and Chris Martin.
 
As a composer, Gray has worked in film and television. He wrote the score for the first season of In My Skin, a comedy-drama series on the BBC and Hulu. He has also composed for the adaptation of Danny Champion of the World for the stage as a musical.
 
In February 2021, Gray was elected as the Chair of the Ivors Academy, the British association of songwriters and composers. He led several campaigns through the academy, which has resulted in an international conversation around reform of the streaming market. He is also an elected Council Member of the Performing Rights Society.
 
On June 9, 2022, Gray was awarded the Unsung Hero Award by the Music Producers Guild, UK.

References 

Living people
British singer-songwriters
British indie rock musicians
British activists
Year of birth missing (living people)